The 2008 Swedish Golf Tour, known as the SAS Masters Tour for sponsorship reasons, was the 23rd season of the Swedish Golf Tour, a series of professional golf tournaments for women held in Sweden and Finland.

Scandinavian Airlines replaced Telia Company as the tour's main sponsor and minimum purse for tournaments were raised to SEK 300,000. The sponsorship agreement amounted to a total of SEK 55 million and included the men's SAS Masters (formerly Scandinavian Masters) and women's SAS Masters in Norway. 

The Swedish International, held since 1962 and included on the tour since its inception in 1986, was discontinued.

Teenage twins Jacqueline and Caroline Hedwall finished top at the inaugural SAS Masters Tour event. Catrin Nilsmark and Czech Republic's Zuzana Masinova both won two events, and Masinova won the Order of Merit thanks to three runner-up finishes. 

25 places at the LET event Göteborg Masters was reserved for players of the tour.

Schedule
The season consisted of 12 tournaments played between May and October, where one event was held in Finland, and one was a Ladies European Tour event.

Order of Merit
An official feeder tour for the Ladies European Tour, the top two finishers in the Order of Merit earned LET cards for 2009. The two qualifiers received Exemption Category 7, ahead of the 30 Q-School graduates with Category 8A. Johanna Lundberg received the second card, as Catrin Nilsmark was already exempt in Category 2, after winning an LET major, the Evian Masters.

See also
2008 Swedish Golf Tour (men's tour)

References

External links
Official homepage of the Swedish Golf Tour

Swedish Golf Tour (women)
Swedish Golf Tour (women)